Beeton's Christmas Annual was a British paperback magazine printed yearly between 1860 and 1898, founded by Samuel Orchart Beeton. The November 1887 issue contained a novel by Arthur Conan Doyle entitled A Study in Scarlet which introduced the characters Sherlock Holmes and his friend Watson.

References

External links

 The Best of Sherlock Holmes – Beeton's Christmas Annual 1887: An Annotated Checklist and Census
 Beeton's Christmas Annual 1887 (Wikisource)

1860 establishments in England
1898 disestablishments in England
Annual magazines published in the United Kingdom
Christmas literature
Christmas in England
Defunct magazines published in the United Kingdom
Magazines established in 1860
Magazines disestablished in 1898